Fáider Fabio Burbano Castilla  (born 12 June 1992) is a Colombian professional footballer who plays as a winger.

Club career
Born in Tumaco, Colombia, Burbano started his career with the youth ranks of Colombian side Envigado. In 2009, he joined the first team as a 17-year-old. He plays primarily as a forward or winger.

During January 2011 Burbano joined Chicago Fire SC of Major League Soccer for a trial period.

On 27 June 2022, Armenian Premier League club Alashkert announced the signings of Burbano from Águila. On 28 January 2023, Alashkert announced the departure of Burbano.

International career

Fabio Burbano has participated in various youth national teams for Colombia, including the Under-17 and Under-20 national team. He also was a member of the Colombian squad that finished fourth in the 2009 South American Under-17 Football Championship.

References

External links

1992 births
Living people
Colombian footballers
Colombian expatriate footballers
Categoría Primera A players
Uruguayan Primera División players
First Professional Football League (Bulgaria) players
Envigado F.C. players
Independiente Medellín footballers
Atlético Bucaramanga footballers
Águilas Doradas Rionegro players
Independiente Santa Fe footballers
Rampla Juniors players
Botev Plovdiv players
FC Alashkert players
Colombian expatriate sportspeople in Uruguay
Expatriate footballers in Uruguay
Colombian expatriate sportspeople in Bulgaria
Expatriate footballers in Bulgaria
Expatriate footballers in Armenia
Armenian Premier League players
Association football wingers
People from Tumaco
Sportspeople from Nariño Department